Herrenknecht AG is a German company that manufactures tunnel boring machines, headquartered in Allmannsweier, Schwanau, Baden-Württemberg. It is the worldwide market leader for heavy tunnel boring machines. Roughly two-thirds of its 5,000 employees work at the company's headquarters in the installation of hydraulic and electronic components and final inspection. Approximately 300 work at three locations across China. The company has 82 subsidiaries around the world and has worked on 2,600 projects.

History 
Martin Herrenknecht established the Martin Herrenknecht engineering company in 1975. Two years later, it became Herrenknecht GmbH with capital of 20 million euros. By 1984, Herrenknecht had opened Herrenknecht International Ltd. in Sunderland, England, its first foreign subsidiary.

The company later acquired shares in Maschinen und Stahlbau GmbH of Dresden in 1991. Following the merger of the two companies in 1988, Herrenknecht became a joint-stock company (AG), expanded worldwide, and adopted its current name.

To increase the capacity of the Elbe Tunnel in Hamburg, Germany (completed in 2002), the company used a 14.20m diameter TBM, then the largest in the world. The boring of the famous Gotthard Base Tunnel in Switzerland, using the company's machinery, was completed in 2009. In 2011, eight £10 million tunnel boring machines were commissioned for the 13 miles of Crossrail which runs beneath London. Their cutting heads were 6.2 meters across.

In 2014 the company reported a record level of orders at 1.2 billion euros, primarily aided by new metro-system expansions in Middle Eastern and Asian cities.

Products and services 
The company works with the mining, transport and energy sectors, building TBMs for road, railway, metro and utilities construction. In mining, it offers a range of automation technology including underground vehicles, conveyor belts and monitoring systems, and shaft-drilling equipment. In the energy industry, it provides equipment for oil and gas pipelines, fossil fuel exploration, geothermal energy development and electricity tunnels. Its drilling rigs can reach 8 kilometers underground and its TBMs range in diameter from 10 cm to 19 meters.

Its other services include tunneling personnel, spare parts/refurbishment, installation, rental and re-used TBMs. As an international company, 90% of its sales were outside of Germany .

Gallery

References

External links 
 
 Vertical Shaft-sinking Machine technology, Herrenknecht VSM.
 Earth Pressure Balance tunnel segmental lining, Herrenknecht EPB

1975 establishments in West Germany
Companies based in Baden-Württemberg
Construction equipment manufacturers of Germany
Geotechnical engineering companies
German brands
Manufacturing companies established in 1975
Subterranean excavating equipment companies
German companies established in 1975